A rotten or pocket borough, also known as a nomination borough or proprietorial borough, was a parliamentary borough or constituency in England, Great Britain, or the United Kingdom before the Reform Act 1832, which had a very small electorate and could be used by a patron to gain unrepresentative influence within the unreformed House of Commons. The same terms were used for similar boroughs represented in the 18th-century Parliament of Ireland. The Reform Act 1832 abolished the majority of these rotten and pocket boroughs.

Background
A parliamentary borough was a town or former town that had been incorporated under a royal charter, giving it the right to send two elected burgesses as Members of Parliament (MPs) to the House of Commons. It was not unusual for the physical boundary of the settlement to change as the town developed or contracted over time, for example due to changes in its trade and industry, so that the boundaries of the parliamentary borough and of the physical settlement were no longer the same.

For centuries, constituencies electing members to the House of Commons did not change to reflect population shifts, and in some places the number of electors became so few that they could be bribed or otherwise influenced by a single wealthy patron. In the early 19th century, reformists scornfully called these boroughs "rotten boroughs" or "pocket boroughs", or more formally "nomination boroughs", because their democratic processes were rotten and their MPs were elected by the whim of the patron, thus "in his pocket"; the actual votes of the electors were a mere formality; all or most of them voted as the patron instructed them, with or without bribery. As voting was by show of hands at a single polling station at a single time, none dared to vote contrary to the instructions of the patron. Often only one candidate would be nominated (or two for a two-seat constituency), so that the election was uncontested.

Thus an MP might represent only a few constituents, while at the same time many new towns, which had grown due to increased trade and industry, were entirely unrepresented, or inadequately represented. For example, before 1832 the town of Manchester, which expanded rapidly during the Industrial Revolution from a small settlement into a large city, was merely part of the larger county constituency of Lancashire and did not elect its own MPs.

Many of these ancient boroughs elected two MPs. By the time of the 1831 general election, out of 406 elected members, 152 were chosen by fewer than 100 voters each, and 88 by fewer than fifty voters.

By the early 19th century moves were made towards reform, with eventual success when the Reform Act 1832 abolished the rotten boroughs and redistributed representation in Parliament to new major population centres. The Ballot Act 1872 introduced the secret ballot, which greatly hindered patrons from controlling elections by preventing them from knowing how an elector had voted. At the same time, the practice of paying or entertaining voters ("treating") was outlawed, and election expenses fell dramatically.

Rotten boroughs
The term rotten borough came into use in the 18th century; it meant a parliamentary borough with a tiny electorate, so small that voters were susceptible to control in a variety of ways, as it had declined in population and importance since its early days. The word rotten had the connotation of corruption as well as long-term decline. In such boroughs most or all of the few electors could not vote as they pleased, due to the lack of a secret ballot and their dependency on the "owner" of the borough. Only rarely were the views or personal character of a candidate taken into consideration, except by the minority of voters who were not beholden to a particular interest.

Typically, rotten boroughs had gained their representation in Parliament when they were more flourishing centres, but the borough's boundaries had never been updated, or else they had become depopulated or even deserted over the centuries. Some had once been important places or had played a major role in England's history, but had fallen into insignificance as for example when industry moved away. For example, in the 12th century Old Sarum had been a busy cathedral city, reliant on the wealth expended by its own Sarum Cathedral within its city precincts, but it was abandoned when the cathedral was moved to create the present Salisbury Cathedral, built on a new site nearby ("New Sarum").  The new site immediately attracted merchants and workers who built up a new town around it. Despite this dramatic loss of population, the constituency of Old Sarum retained its right to elect two MPs, effectively putting it in control of a single landowning family.

Many such rotten boroughs were controlled by landowners and peers who might give the seats in Parliament to their like-minded friends or relations, or who went to Parliament themselves, if they were not already members of the House of Lords. They also commonly sold them for money or other favours; the peers who controlled such boroughs had a double influence in Parliament as they themselves held seats in the House of Lords. This patronage was based on property rights which could be inherited and passed on to heirs, or else sold, like any other form of property.

Before being awarded a peerage, Arthur Wellesley, later Duke of Wellington, served in the Irish House of Commons as a Member for the rotten borough of Trim. Robert Stewart, Viscount Castlereagh served as a Member for the rotten borough of Plympton Erle.

Pocket boroughs
Pocket boroughs were boroughs which could effectively be controlled by a single person who owned at least half of the "burgage tenements", the occupants of which had the right to vote in the borough's parliamentary elections. A wealthy patron therefore had merely to buy up these specially qualified houses and install in them his own tenants, selected for their willingness to do their landlord's bidding, or given such precarious forms of tenure that they dared not displease him. As there was no secret ballot until 1872, the landowner could evict electors who did not vote for the two men he wanted. A common expression referring to such a situation was that "Mr A had been elected on Lord B's interest".

There were also boroughs which were controlled not by a particular patron but rather by the Crown, specifically by the departments of state of the Treasury or Admiralty, and which thus returned the candidates nominated by the ministers in charge of those departments.

Some rich individuals controlled several boroughs; for example, the Duke of Newcastle is said to have had seven boroughs "in his pocket". One of the representatives of a pocket borough was often the man who controlled it, and for this reason they were also referred to as proprietarial boroughs.

Pocket boroughs were seen by their 19th-century owners as a valuable method of ensuring the representation of the landed interest in the House of Commons.

Significantly diminished by the Reform Act 1832, pocket boroughs were for all practical purposes abolished by the Reform Act of 1867. This considerably extended the borough franchise and established the principle that each parliamentary constituency should hold roughly the same number of electors. Boundary commissions were set up by subsequent Acts of Parliament to maintain this principle as population movements continued.

Reform
In the late 18th century, many political societies, such as the London Corresponding Society and the Society of the Friends of the People, called for parliamentary reform. Specifically, they thought that the rotten borough system was unfair and they called for a more equal distribution of representatives that reflected the population of Britain. However, legislation enacted by William Pitt the Younger caused these societies to disband by making it illegal for them to meet or publish information.

In the 19th century, there were moves toward reform, which broadly meant ending the over-representation of boroughs with few electors. The culmination of the process of Catholic Emancipation in 1829 finally brought the reform issue to a head. The reform movement had a major success in the Reform Act 1832, which disfranchised the 56 boroughs listed below, most of them in the south and west of England. This redistributed representation in Parliament to new major population centres and places with significant industries, which tended to be farther north.

Buckinghamshire
 Wendover
 Amersham

Cornwall
 Bossiney
 Callington
 Camelford
 East Looe
 Fowey
 Lostwithiel
 Mitchell or St Michael's
 Newport
 Saltash
 St Germans
 St Mawes
 Tregony
 West Looe

Devon
 Beeralston
 Okehampton
 Plympton Erle

Hampshire
 Newtown, Isle of Wight
 Stockbridge
 Whitchurch
 Yarmouth, Isle of Wight

Kent
 New Romney
 Queenborough

Northamptonshire
 Brackley 
 Higham Ferrers

Suffolk
 Aldeburgh
 Dunwich
 Orford

Somerset
 Ilchester
 Milborne Port
 Minehead

Surrey
 Bletchingley
 Gatton
 Haslemere

Sussex
 Bramber
 East Grinstead
 Seaford
 Steyning
 Winchelsea

Wiltshire
 Downton
 Great Bedwyn
 Heytesbury
 Hindon
 Ludgershall
 Old Sarum
 Wootton Bassett

Yorkshire
 Aldborough, West Riding
 Boroughbridge, North Riding
 Hedon, East Riding

Other counties
 Appleby, Westmorland
 Bishop's Castle, Shropshire
 Castle Rising, Norfolk
 Corfe Castle, Dorset
 Newton, Lancashire
 Weobley, Herefordshire

Contemporary defences
A substantial number of Tory constituencies were rotten and pocket boroughs, and their right to representation was defended by the successive Tory governments in office between 1807 and 1830. During this period they came under criticism from figures such as Thomas Paine and William Cobbett.

It was argued in defence of such boroughs that they provided stability and were also a means for promising young politicians to enter Parliament, with William Pitt the Elder being cited as a key example. Some MPs claimed that the boroughs should be retained, as Britain had enjoyed periods of prosperity while they were part of the constitution of Parliament.

Because British colonists in the West Indies and British North America, and those in the Indian subcontinent, had no representation of their own at Westminster, representatives of these groups often claimed that rotten boroughs provided opportunities for virtual representation in Parliament for colonial interest groups.

The Tory politician Spencer Perceval asked the nation to look at the system as a whole, saying that if pocket boroughs were disenfranchised, the whole system was liable to collapse.

Modern usage 

The magazine Private Eye has a column entitled "Rotten Boroughs", which lists stories of municipal wrongdoing. In this instance, "boroughs" refers to local government districts rather than parliamentary constituencies.

In his book The Age of Consent (2003), George Monbiot compared small island states with one vote in the United Nations General Assembly to "rotten boroughs".

The term "rotten borough" is sometimes used to disparage electorates used to gain political leverage. In Hong Kong and Macau, functional constituencies (with small voter bases attached to special interests) are often referred to as "rotten boroughs" by long-time columnist Jake van der Kamp. In New Zealand, the term has been used to refer to electorates which, by dint of an agreement for a larger party, have been won by a minor party, enabling that party to gain more seats under the country's proportional representation system. The Spectator has described the London Borough of Tower Hamlets as a "rotten borough", and in 2015 The Independent reported that Tower Hamlets was to be the subject of an investigation into electoral fraud.

The Electoral Reform Society produced a list of "Rotten Boroughs" for the 2019 United Kingdom local elections, with Fenland District Council at the top.

In popular culture

Literature
In the satirical novel Melincourt, or Sir Oran Haut-Ton (1817) by Thomas Love Peacock, an orang-utan named Sir Oran Haut-Ton is elected to parliament by the "ancient and honourable borough of Onevote". The election of Sir Oran forms part of the hero's plan to persuade civilisation to share his belief that orang-utans are a race of human beings who merely lack the power of speech. "The borough of Onevote stood in the middle of a heath, and consisted of a solitary farm, of which the land was so poor and intractable, that it would not have been worth the while of any human being to cultivate it, had not the Duke of Rottenburgh found it very well worth his while to pay his tenant for living there, to keep the honourable borough in existence." The single voter of the borough, Mr Christopher Corporate, elects two MPs, each of whom "can only be considered as the representative of half of him".
In the parliamentary novels of Anthony Trollope rotten boroughs are a recurring theme. John Grey, Phineas Finn, and Lord Silverbridge are all elected by rotten boroughs.
In Chapter 7 of the novel Vanity Fair (published 1847–1848), author William Makepeace Thackeray introduces the fictitious borough of "Queen's Crawley", so named in honour of a stopover in the small Hampshire town of Crawley by Queen Elizabeth I, who, delighted by the quality of the local beer, instantly raised the small town of Crawley into a borough, giving it two members in Parliament. At the time of the story, set in the early 19th century, the place had lost population, so that it was "come down to that condition of borough which used to be denominated rotten". Queen's Crawley re-appears in Thackeray's The Virginians (published in 1857–1859).
In Charles Dickens' novel Our Mutual Friend (1864–1865), a borough called "Pocket-Breaches" elects Mr. Veneering as its MP.
The novel Rotten Borough was a controversial story published by Oliver Anderson under the pen name Julian Pine in 1937, republished in 1989.
In Diana Wynne Jones' 2003 book The Merlin Conspiracy, Old Sarum features as a character, with one line being "I'm a rotten borough, I am."
In the Aubrey–Maturin series of sea-faring tales, the pocket borough of Milport (also known as Milford) is initially held by General Aubrey, the father of protagonist Jack Aubrey. In the twelfth novel in the series, The Letter of Marque (1988), Jack's father dies and the seat is offered to Jack himself by his cousin Edward Norton, the "owner" of the borough. The borough has just seventeen electors, all of whom are tenants of Mr Norton.
In the 1969 first novel of George MacDonald Fraser's The Flashman Papers series, the eponymous antihero, Harry Flashman, mentions that his father, Sir Buckley Flashman, had been in Parliament, but "they did for him at Reform" – implying that the elder Flashman had sat for a rotten or pocket borough.

Television
In the episode "Dish and Dishonesty" of the BBC television comedy Blackadder the Third, Edmund Blackadder attempts to bolster support for the Prince Regent in Parliament by getting the incompetent Baldrick elected to the fictional rotten borough of Dunny-on-the-Wold (presumably a reference to Dunwich). He easily accomplished this with a result of 16,472 to nil, even though the constituency had only one voter (Blackadder himself).

Video games
The video game Assassin's Creed III briefly mentions pocket and rotten boroughs in a database entry entitled "Pocket Boroughs", with Old Sarum identified as one of the worst examples of a pocket borough. In the game, shortly before the Boston Massacre, a non-player character (NPC) can be heard speaking to a group of people on the colonies' lack of representation in Parliament and listing several rotten boroughs, including Old Sarum.

Quotations

See also 
 Apportionment (politics)
 Functional constituencies in Hong Kong and Macau
 Gerrymandering

References 
Notes

Further reading
 Namier, Lewis (1957) [1929] The Structure of Politics at the Accession of George III
 Spielvogel, Jackson J. (2003) Western Civilization – Volume II: Since 1500 p. 493

 
Electoral fraud
Corruption in the United Kingdom
Constituencies of the Parliament of the United Kingdom
Political history of the United Kingdom
Apportionment by country